Johan Lora (born 20 October 1982) is a Dominican international footballer who plays college soccer in the United States for Lincoln University, playing as a midfielder.

Career
Lora has played college soccer for Lincoln University since 2008.

Lora also earned one cap for the Dominican Republic national team in March 2008.

References

1982 births
Living people
Dominican Republic footballers
Dominican Republic international footballers
Association football midfielders